R412 road may refer to:
 R412 road (Ireland)
 R412 (South Africa)